The 1999 United States elections, which were held on Tuesday, November 2, were off-year elections in which no members of the Congress were standing for election. However, there were three gubernatorial races, state legislative elections in four states, numerous citizen initiatives, mayoral races in several major cities, and a variety of local offices on the ballot.

Federal elections

U.S. House of Representatives special elections
In 1999, three special elections to fill vacancies in the House of Representatives were held.

State elections

Gubernatorial elections

Three states held elections for governor in 1999. Kentucky and Mississippi voted on November 2. Louisiana's election dates do not coincide with that of most states: Louisiana held its open primary on October 23. A runoff election was not needed.

Other statewide elections
In the three states which held regularly scheduled state general elections, elections for state executive branch offices of Lieutenant Governor (in a separate election in Louisiana and Mississippi and on the same ticket as the gubernatorial nominee in Kentucky), Secretary of state, state Treasurer, state Auditor, state Attorney General, and Commissioners of Insurance and Agriculture will be held. In addition, there will also be elections for each states' respective state Supreme Courts and state appellate courts.

State legislative elections
Four states and one territory held elections for their state legislatures.

Initiatives and referendums

Local elections

Mayoral elections
Many major American cities held their mayoral elections in 1999.

Baltimore - Martin O'Malley (D) was elected, succeeding Kurt Schmoke (D).
Columbus - Michael B. Coleman (D) was elected, succeeding Greg Lashutka (R).
Chicago - Incumbent Mayor Richard M. Daley (D) was re-elected. Chicago was the most populous city to hold a mayoral election in 1999.
Houston - Incumbent mayor Lee P. Brown was reelected
Philadelphia - Mayor John F. Street (D) was elected, succeeding Ed Rendell (D).
San Francisco - Mayor Willie Brown (D) was reelected.

References

 General
1999
November 1999 events in the United States